Franjo Dijak (born 2 June 1977) is a Croatian actor. He appeared in more than twenty films since 1997.

Dijak provides the voice of Po in the Croatian dub of the entire Kung Fu Panda franchise.

Selected filmography

References

External links 

1977 births
Living people
Male actors from Zagreb
Croatian male film actors